Félix Routhier (May 21, 1827 – December 23, 1903) was an Ontario businessman and political figure. He represented Prescott in the House of Commons of Canada as a Conservative member from 1878 to 1882.

He was born in Saint-Placide, Lower Canada in 1827, the son of farmer Charles Routhier. He married Angelique Lemay dit Delorme in 1849. He served as justice of the peace, major in the local militia and mayor of Saint-Placide. In 1870, he moved to Vankleek Hill, Ontario, where he took over the operation of a foundry. Routhier defeated Albert Hagar to win the Prescott seat in 1878; he was defeated by Simon Labrosse in the elections that followed in 1882 and 1887 and by Isidore Proulx in 1891. The foundry at Vankleek Hill went bankrupt in 1897.

He was the brother of judge Adolphe-Basile Routhier.

References 
 Histoire des Comtes Unis de Prescott et de Russell, L. Brault (1963)

External links 

The Canadian parliamentary companion and annual register, 1881, CH Mackintosh
Vankleek Hill & District Historical Society

1827 births
Conservative Party of Canada (1867–1942) MPs
Members of the House of Commons of Canada from Ontario
Mayors of places in Quebec
Franco-Ontarian people
1903 deaths
Canadian justices of the peace